The Israeli pianist Yaara Tal (born 27 February 1955, in Kfar Saba) and her German partner Andreas Groethuysen (born 2 September 1956, in Munich) are a piano duo.

Yaara Tal studied with Ilona Vincze and Arie Vardi before going to Germany where she finished her studies with Hugo Steurer and Ludwig Hoffmann. Andreas Groethuysen, son of Herbert Groethuysen, studied in Munich with Ludwig Hoffmann and in London with Peter Feuchtwanger.

Since 1985 they have been performing worldwide as piano duo and have appeared at musical centers and renowned festivals.

Extensive CD recording makes up an important part of their career: the Duo has released recordings of four-hand piano music not only with central works of the repertoire but also introducing less familiar names to a wide public.

For their recordings the duo received numerous prizes and honours, like the "Preis der Deutschen Schallplattenkritik", the Echo prize of the German Phono Academy and the "Cannes Classical Award". The recordings have been praised for their programmatic ingenuity as well as their pianistic transparency and the brightness of the duo's interpretations.

Discography 

 Franz Xaver Mozart, Frédéric Chopin - Polonaise, Yaara Tal 2017
 Claude Debussy, Richard Strauss - COLORS, Tal & Groethuysen 2017
 The Art of Tal & Groethuysen BOX - 10 CDs 2016
 Claude Debussy, Reynaldo Hahn - 1915 2015
 Joseph Haydn - Seven Last Words, Yaara Tal 2014
 Gioachino Rossini - Petite Messe Solennelle, Duo Tal & Groethuysen 2014
 Mozart & Czerny - Concertos for two Pianists and Orchestra, Duo Tal & Groethuysen 2014
 Richard Wagner - Götterdämmerung, Duo Tal & Groethuysen 2013
 DIE ZEIT - Genuss-Edition Klavier [Box-Set], Duo Tal & Groethuysen 2012
 Vaughan Williams - Concerto for Two Pianos & Orchestra, Duo Tal & Groethuysen 2012 - Echo-Preis der Deutschen Phono Akademie 2013
 Romantic Piano Music - for Four Hands [Box-Set], Duo Tal & Groethuysen Juni 2012
 Antonín Dvořák - Slawische Tänze op. 46, op. 72, Duo Tal & Groethuysen 2011
 Brahms - Klavierkonzerte Nr. 1, Schubert - 20 Ländler, Arranged for Piano 4 Hands by Brahms, Duo Tal & Groethuysen 2011
 Francis Poulenc - Concerto, Duo Tal & Groethuysen 2010
 Johann Sebastian Bach - Goldberg-Variationen (Fassung für zwei Klaviere von J.Rheinberger und Max Reger) 2009
 Mendelssohn for 4 Hands - Octet Op. 20 & Symphony No. 1 Op. 11, Duo Tal & Groethuysen 2009
 Johannes Brahms, Reinhard Febel, Max Reger - Choral préludes - Preis der Deutschen Schallplatten Kritik 2008
 Wolfgang Amadeus Mozart - Sämtliche Werke für 2 Pianisten (3 Vol.)- Echo-Preis der Deutschen Phono Akademie 2005 und 2007
 Max Reger - Suite Op. 16 / Six Pieces Op. 94 - Preis der Deutschen Schallplatten Kritik 2004
 Robert Schumann, Johannes Brahms - Inspiration & Adoration - Werke für Klavier zu 4 Händen 2003
 Children's Corner - Vierhändige Klavierwerke von Georges Bizet, Jean Françaix, Ottorino Respighi, Walter Gieseking, Joseph Dichler 2002 - Preis der Deutschen Schallplatten Kritik 2002
 Charles Koechlin - Werke für Klavier zu 4 Händen - Echo-Preis der Deutschen Phono Akademie 2001
 Richard Wagner - Transkriptionen für Klavier zu vier Händen 1997
 Franz Schubert - Sämtliche Werke für Klavier zu vier Händen (7 Vol.) 1994 - Echo-Preis der Deutschen Phono Akademie 1997 - Cannes Classical Award 1998
 Théodore Gouvy 1994 - Werke für Klavier zu 4 Händen - Preis der Deutschen Schallplatten Kritik 1994
 Johannes Brahms - Ungarische Tänze, Walzer 1992
 Felix Mendelssohn Bartholdy - Klaviermusik zu 4 Händen 1992 - Preis der Deutschen Schallplatten Kritik 1993
 Max Reger - Klaviermusik vierhändig 1992 - Preis der Deutschen Schallplatten Kritik 1992
 Antonín Dvořák, Anton Rubinstein, Sergej Rachmaninoff 1992 - Werke für Klavier zu 4 Händen 1992
 Carl Czerny - Werke für Klavier zu 4 Händen 1991 - Preis der Deutschen Schallplatten Kritik 1992
 Johann Nepomuk Hummel - Werke für Klavier zu 4 Händen - Label: Koch/Schwann 1988

External links
Homepage Duo Tal & Groethuysen
Duo Tal & Groethuysen on facebook
 Hear Tal & Groethuysen in concert  from WGBH Radio Boston

Tal, Yaara
Groethuysen, Andreas
Living people
Groethuysen, Andreas
Israeli classical pianists
Classical piano duos
Musical groups established in 1985
21st-century classical pianists